The 4th Battle Squadron was a squadron of the British Royal Navy consisting of battleships.  The 4th Battle Squadron was initially part of the Royal Navy's Home Fleet (1912–14) and then the Grand Fleet after the outbreak of the First World War. The squadron changed composition often as ships were damaged, retired or transferred.

August 1914

On 5 August 1914, the squadron was constituted as follows:

January 1915 

By January 1915, the composition had changed slightly:

 HMS Agincourt
 HMS Bellerophon
 HMS Dreadnought
 HMS Temeraire

Battle of Jutland, June 1916 
As an element in the Grand Fleet, the squadron participated in the Battle of Jutland.  During the battle, the composition of the 4th Battle Squadron was as follows:
Third Division
 , fleet flagship of Admiral Sir John Jellicoe; Captain Frederic Dreyer;
 , Captain C. Maclachlan;
 , flagship of Rear Admiral A. L. Duff; Captain E. Hyde-Parker;
 , Captain W. C. M. Nicholson;
Fourth Division
 HMS Benbow, flagship of Vice Admiral Sir Doveton Sturdee; Captain H. W. Parker;
 HMS Bellerophon, Captain E. F. Bruen;
 HMS Temeraire, Captain E. V. Underhill;
 , Captain J. D. Dick;

January 1917 
Following the Battle of Jutland, the 4th Battle Squadron was reorganized, with Colossus, Hercules, St. Vincent, Collingwood and Neptune all transferred from the 1st Battle Squadron. In January 1917, the squadron was constituted as follows:

 HMS Bellerophon
 HMS Temeraire
 HMS Vanguard
 HMS Superb
 
 
 
 
 

After the loss of HMS Vanguard in July 1917, HMS Superb and HMS Temeraire were detached to the Mediterranean in 1918. HMS Dreadnought rejoined the squadron as flagship in March 1918.

Postwar 
The squadron was dispersed in February 1919, appears to have been formally dissolved in March 1919, but then reformed. 

In September 1920 Rear Admiral Richard Webb was posted to the Mediterranean as Rear-Admiral 4th Battle Squadron and Second-in-Command, Mediterranean Fleet. He served there until 1922.

Admirals commanding
Post holders as follows:

Rear-Admirals, Second-in-Command
Post holders as follows:

Notes

External links
 Fourth Battle Squadron at DreadnoughtProject.org

References
 
 

Battle squadrons of the Royal Navy
Military units and formations established in 1912
Military units and formations disestablished in 1924
Ship squadrons of the Royal Navy in World War I